This list of the prehistoric life of Arizona contains the various prehistoric life-forms whose fossilized remains have been reported from within the US state of Arizona.

Precambrian
The Paleobiology Database records no known occurrences of Precambrian fossils in Arizona.

Paleozoic

Selected Paleozoic taxa of Arizona

 †Achistrum
 †Aglaocrinus
 †Altudoceras
 †Alula
 †Amphiscapha
  †Annularia
 †Annularia asteris
 †Annularia mucronata
 †Annularia stellata
 †Anomphalus
 †Aphyllopteris
 †Arastra – type locality for genus
 †Archaeocidaris
  †Archimedes
 †Archimedes intermedius
 †Archimedes invaginatus
 †Archimedes lativolvis
 †Archimedes proutanus
 †Archimedes terebriformis
 †Arizonerpeton – type locality for genus
 †Athyris
 †Aulopora
 †Aviculopecten
 †Aviculopecten bellatulus – type locality for species
 †Aviculopecten girtyi – or unidentified comparable form
 †Aviculopecten kaibabensis – type locality for species
  †Bellerophon
 †Brachyphyllum
  †Calamites
 †Calamites cisti
 †Callipteris
 †Callipteris conferta
 †Camarotoechia
 †Camarotoechia metallica
 †Camarotoechia mutata
 †Caninia – tentative report
 †Chonetes
 †Chonetes oklahomensis
 †Cleiothyridina
 †Cleiothyridina orbicularis
  †Composita
 †Composita humilis
 †Composita laevis
 †Composita mexicana
 †Composita ovata
 †Composita ozarkana
 †Composita subtilita
 †Composita trinuclea
 †Cooksonia – or unidentified comparable form
 †Cordaites
 †Cordaites principalis
 †Cycloceras
 †Cyclopteris
 †Cymatochiton – tentative report
  †Cyrtospirifer
 †Cyrtospirifer whitneyi
 †Cystodictya
 †Echinaria
 †Edmondia
 †Elfridia – type locality for genus
  †Elrathia
 Eocaudina
 †Euomphalus
 †Euomphalus utahensis
 †Fenestella
 †Fusulina
  †Glikmanius
 †Glikmanius occidentalis
 †Globular
 †Gnathorhiza – or unidentified comparable form
 †Hastimima – tentative report
 †Hedeia
 †Hexagonaria
 †Hyolithes
 †Icriodus
 †Idiognathodus
 †Kaibabvenator – type locality for genus
 †Kaibabvenator swiftae – type locality for species
  †Kootenia
 †Lepidodendron
 †Lepidodendron aculeatum
 †Lepidostrobus
 †Lingula
 †Lingulella
 †Liroceras
  †Metacoceras
 †Michelina
 †Modiolus
 †Murchisonia
 †Naticopsis
 †Naticopsis kaibabensis – type locality for species
 †Naticopsis waterlooensis
 †Neospirifer – tentative report
 †Neospirifer dunbari
 †Neuropteris
 †Neuropteris heterophylla
 †Neuropteris scheuchzeri
 †Nisusia
 Nucula
  †Olenellus
 †Ophiderpeton
 †Orodus
  †Orthacanthus
 †Pachyphyllum
 †Pagiophyllum
 †Paladin
 †Palmatolepis
 †Palmatolepis triangularis
 †Paterina
 †Pecopteris
 †Pentremites
 †Petalodus
 †Phillipsia
  †Phlegethontia
 †Pinna
 †Platyceras
 †Polygnathus
 †Prodentalium
 †Ptyonius – tentative report
 †Rugosa
 †Sallya – tentative report
 †Scoyenia
 Serpula
 Solemya
 †Solenomorpha – report made of unidentified related form or using admittedly obsolete nomenclature
 †Spathognathodus
  †Sphenophyllum
 †Sphenophyllum gilmorei – type locality for species
 †Sphenophyllum oblongifolium
 †Sphenopteris
 †Spirifer
 †Spirifer centronatus
 †Spiriferina
  †Stigmaria
 †Stroboceras
 †Syringopora
 †Tainoceras
  †Triodus
 †Venustodus
 †Vidria
 †Walchia
 †Wardia
 †Wilkingia
 †Worthenia
 †Yarravia
 Yoldia

Mesozoic

Selected Mesozoic taxa of Arizona

 †Acaenasuchus – type locality for genus
 †Acaenasuchus geoffreyi – type locality for species
 †Acallosuchus – type locality for genus
 †Acallosuchus rectori – type locality for species
  †Acanthohoplites
 †Acanthohoplites berkeyi
 †Acanthohoplites erraticus
 †Acanthohoplites hesper
 †Acanthohoplites impetrabilis
 †Acanthohoplites schucherti
 †Acanthohoplites teres
 Acirsa
 Acmaea
 †Acrodus
 †Acteon
 †Adamanasuchus – type locality for genus
 †Adamanasuchus eisenhardtae – type locality for species
  †Adocus
  †Allocrioceras
 †Ammorhynchus – type locality for genus
 †Ammorhynchus navajoi – type locality for species
 †Anaschisma – report made of unidentified related form or using admittedly obsolete nomenclature
 †Angistorhinus – tentative report
 †Anisoceras
 †Anomia
 †Apachesaurus
 †Apachesaurus gregorii
  †Apatosaurus
 †Araucarioxylon
  †Araucarioxylon arizonicum
 †Arca
 Arctica
 †Arganodus
  †Arizonasaurus – type locality for genus
 †Arizonasaurus babbitti – type locality for species
 Astarte
 †Australosomus – or unidentified comparable form
 †Baculites
 †Baculites calamus
 Barbatia
 †Beudanticeras
 †Boreosomus – tentative report
 Cadulus
 †Calamites
 †Calamophylliopsis
 †Calsoyasuchus – type locality for genus
 †Calsoyasuchus valliceps – type locality for species
 †Calycoceras
 †Calyptosuchus
 †Calyptosuchus wellesi
  †Camposaurus – type locality for genus
 †Camposaurus arizonensis – type locality for species
 †Caprina
 Carota
  †Ceratodus
 Cerithiopsis
 Charonia – tentative report
 †Chatterjeea
  †Chindesaurus – type locality for genus
 †Chindesaurus bryansmalli – type locality for species
  †Chinlea – tentative report
 †Chirotherium
 †Chirotherium barthii
 †Chirotherium rex – type locality for species
 †Chirotherium sickleri
 Chlamys
 †Cibolaites
 †Coelophysis
  †Coelophysis kayentakatae – type locality for species
 †Collignoniceras
 †Collignoniceras woollgari
 †Colognathus
 Corbula
 †Cosgriffius – type locality for genus
 †Craniscus
 Crassostrea
  †Crosbysaurus
 †Crosbysaurus harrisae
 Cucullaea
 †Cunningtoniceras
 Cuspidaria
 †Cyclothyris
 Cylichna
  †Dentalium
 †Desmatochelys
  †Desmatosuchus
 †Desmatosuchus haplocerus
 †Desmatosuchus spurensis
 †Dilophosauripus – type locality for genus
  †Dilophosaurus
 †Dilophosaurus wetherilli – type locality for species
 †Dinnebitodon – type locality for genus
 †Dinnebitodon amarali – type locality for species
 Discinisca
 †Dolicholatirus – tentative report
  †Dromomeron
 †Dromomeron gregorii
 †Dufrenoyia
 †Dufrenoyia compitalis
 †Dufrenoyia joserita
 †Dufrenoyia justinae
 †Edentosuchus – tentative report
 Elliptio
  †Eocaecilia – type locality for genus
 †Eocaecilia micropodia – type locality for species
 †Eocyclotosaurus
 †Eopneumatosuchus – type locality for genus
 †Eopneumatosuchus colberti – type locality for species
 †Eucalycoceras
 †Eulima – tentative report
 †Eunaticina
 †Euomphaloceras
 †Euspira
  †Exogyra
 †Exogyra acroumbonata
 †Exogyra lancha
 †Exogyra levis
 †Exogyra olisiponensis
 †Fagesia
  †Gervillia
 †Gervillia cholla
 †Gervillia heinemani
 †Gervillia navajovus – type locality for species
 †Gervillia rasori
 Ginkgo
  †Grallator
 †Gryphaea
 †Gyrolepis
 †Hadrokkosaurus – type locality for genus
 †Hadrokkosaurus bradyi – type locality for species
 †Hamites
 †Hamulus
  †Hesperosuchus – type locality for genus
 †Hesperosuchus agilis – type locality for species
 Homarus
 †Hopiichnus – type locality for genus
 †Hybodus
  †Inoceramus
 †Inoceramus corpulentas
 †Inoceramus dimidius – or unidentified comparable form
 †Inoceramus flavus
 †Inoceramus heinzi – or unidentified related form
 †Inoceramus lamarcki
 †Inoceramus nodai
 †Inoceramus pictus
 †Kamerunoceras
 †Kayentachelys – type locality for genus
 †Kayentachelys aprix – type locality for species
 †Kayentapus – type locality for genus
 †Kayentasuchus – type locality for genus
 †Kayentasuchus walkeri – type locality for species
  †Kayentatherium – type locality for genus
 †Kayentatherium wellesi – type locality for species
 †Kayentavenator – type locality for genus
 †Koskinonodon
  Lepisosteus
  †Leptosuchus
 †Leptosuchus crosbiensis
 Lima
 Limatula
 †Linearis
 †Lingula
 †Lissodus – tentative report
 Lithophaga
 †Lonchidion
 Lopha
 †Lucina
 Lunatia – tentative report
  †Machaeroprosopus – type locality for genus
 †Machaeroprosopus buceros
 †Machaeroprosopus jablonskiae – type locality for species
 †Machaeroprosopus mccauleyi – type locality for species
 †Machaeroprosopus pristinus – type locality for species
 †Machaeroprosopus tenuis – type locality for species
 †Machaeroprosopus validus – type locality for species
  †Mammites
 †Megalosauripus
 †Melvius
 Membranipora – or unidentified comparable form
 †Metoicoceras
 †Metoicoceras geslinianum
 †Metoicoceras mosbyense
  †Metoposaurus
 †Modiolus
 †Moenkopia – type locality for genus
 †Monopleura
  †Morganucodon
 †Morrowites
 †Mytilus – tentative report
 †Navahopus – type locality for genus
 †Neithea
 †Neocardioceras
 †Neocardioceras juddii
 †Neocardioceras minutum
 †Neoptychites
 †Nerinea
 Nerita
 Neritina
 Nucula
  †Oligokyphus
 †Opis
 Ostrea
 †Oxytoma
  †Pachyrhizodus – or unidentified comparable form
 †Parasuchus
  †Paratypothorax
 †Parrishia – type locality for genus
 †Pecten
 †Permocalculus
 Pholadomya
 Physa
 †Pinna
 †Placenticeras
 †Placenticeras cumminsi
  †Placerias – type locality for genus
 †Placerias hesternus – type locality for species
 Plicatula
 † Pollex – tentative report
 Polydora – tentative report
  †Poposaurus
 †Poposaurus gracilis
 †Postosuchus
 †Postosuchus kirkpatricki
 †Pravusuchus
 †Pravusuchus hortus
  †Prosalirus – type locality for genus
 †Prosalirus bitis – type locality for species
 †Protome – type locality for genus
 †Protome batalaria – type locality for species
  †Protosuchus – type locality for genus
 †Protosuchus richardsoni – type locality for species
 †Pseudoperna
 †Pteraichnus – type locality for genus
 †Pteraichnus saltwashensis – type locality for species
 Pycnodonte
 †Pycnodonte kellumi – or unidentified related form
 †Pycnodonte newberryi
 †Pyncnodonte
 †Quasicyclotosaurus – type locality for genus
 †Quasicyclotosaurus campi – type locality for species
 †Quitmaniceras
  †Revueltosaurus
 †Revueltosaurus callenderi
 †Revueltosaurus hunti
 †Rhadalognathus – type locality for genus
 †Rhamphinion – type locality for genus
 †Rhamphinion jenkinsi – type locality for species
 Ringicula
 †Rioarribasuchus
 †Rioarribasuchus chamaensis
 Rostellaria
  †Rutiodon
 †Sarahsaurus – type locality for genus
 †Scaphites
 †Scutarx – type locality for genus
  †Scutellosaurus – type locality for genus
 †Scutellosaurus lawleri – type locality for species
  †Segisaurus – type locality for genus
 †Segisaurus halli – type locality for species
 †Selaginella
 †Semionotus – or unidentified comparable form
 †Senis
 Serpula
 †Shuvosaurus
 †Shuvosaurus inexpectatus
  †Smilosuchus – type locality for genus
 †Smilosuchus adamanensis – type locality for species
 †Smilosuchus gregorii – type locality for species
 †Smilosuchus lithodendrorum – type locality for species
 Solemya
  †Sonorasaurus – type locality for genus
 †Sonorasaurus thompsoni – type locality for species
 Spirorbis
 Squilla – tentative report
  †Stagonolepis
 †Stanocephalosaurus – type locality for genus
 †Stanocephalosaurus birdi – type locality for species
 †Syntarsus
 †Tanytrachelos
 †Tecovasaurus
 †Tecovasaurus murryi
 †Tecovasuchus
 †Tecovasuchus chatterjeei
 Tellina
 †Tenea
  †Tenontosaurus
 †Thomasites
 †Tragodesmoceras
 †Trigonia
 †Trigonia aliformis - or unidentified loosely related form
 †Trigonia cragini
 †Trigonia guildi
 †Trigonia kitchini
 †Trigonia mearnsi
 †Trigonia reesidei
 †Trigonia resoluta
 †Trigonia saavedra
 †Trigonia stolleyi
 †Trigonia weaveri
  †Trilophosaurus
 †Trilophosaurus buettneri
 †Trilophosaurus jacobsi – type locality for species
  †Triodus
 Turritella
  †Typothorax
 †Uatchitodon
 †Uatchitodon schneideri
 Unio
  †Vancleavea – type locality for genus
 †Vancleavea campi – type locality for species
 †Vascoceras
 †Vigilius
 †Vigilius wellesi
 Viviparus
 Vulsella
 †Watinoceras
 †Watinoceras coloradoense
 †Watinoceras devonense
 †Watinoceras hattini
 †Watinoceras praecursor – or unidentified comparable form
 †Wellesaurus
 †Wellesaurus peabodyi – type locality for species
 †Yezoites

Cenozoic

Selected Cenozoic taxa of Arizona

 †Adelphailurus
 †Agriotherium
 †Alforjas
 †Ambystoma
 †Ambystoma tigrinum
  †Amphimachairodus
 †Amplibuteo
 Antrozous
 †Antrozous pallidus
 Aquila
  †Arctodus
 †Aztlanolagus
 Baiomys
 Bassariscus
 Bison
 †Borophagus
 †Borophagus diversidens
 †Borophagus parvus – type locality for species
 Brachylagus
 Bufo
 †Bufo woodhousei
  †Camelops
 †Camelops hesternus – or unidentified comparable form
 Canis
 †Canis armbrusteri
  †Canis dirus
 †Canis edwardii
 †Canis ferox
 †Canis latrans
 †Capromeryx
 †Carpocyon
 Castor
 Celtis
 †Celtis reticulata
 Cervus
 †Chasmaporthetes
 †Chrysocyon
 †Citellus
 Cnemidophorus
 Cratogeomys
 Crotaphytus – or unidentified comparable form
  †Cuvieronius
  Desmodus
 †Desmodus stocki
 †Diceratherium
 †Dinohippus
 Dipodomys
 †Dipoides
 †Epicyon
 †Epicyon haydeni
 Eptesicus – or unidentified comparable form
 Equus
  †Equus scotti – or unidentified comparable form
 †Equus simplicidens
 Erethizon
 †Eucyon
 †Eucyon davisi
 Eumeces
 Eumops
 †Eumops perotis – or unidentified comparable form
 †Geococcyx
 †Geococcyx californianus
 Geomys
 †Glossotherium
  †Glyptotherium
 †Glyptotherium texanum
 †Hemiauchenia
 †Hesperotestudo
 Heterodon
 †Heterodon nasicus – or unidentified comparable form
 †Histiotus
  †Homotherium – tentative report
 Hyla
 †Hypolagus
 Ictalurus – tentative report
  †Indarctos – tentative report
 Kinosternon
 †Kinosternon arizonense – type locality for species
 Lampropeltis
 †Lampropeltis getulus
 Lasiurus
 †Lasiurus blossevillii – or unidentified comparable form
 Lemmiscus
 †Lemmiscus curtatus
 Lepus
 Lynx
 †Machairodus
 †Mammut
 †Mammuthus
  †Mammuthus columbi
 Marmota
 Martes
 †Megalonyx
 †Megalonyx jeffersonii
  †Megatylopus
 Meleagris
 †Merychyus
 †Metalopex
 Microtus
 †Morrillia
 Mustela
  †Mustela frenata – or unidentified comparable form
 Myotis
 †Myotis thysanodes
 †Myotis velifer
  †Nannippus
 †Neochoerus
 Neotoma
 †Neotoma albigula – or unidentified comparable form
 †Neotoma cinerea
 †Neotoma mexicana – or unidentified comparable form
 Nerodia
  †Nothrotheriops
 †Nothrotherium
 Notiosorex
 †Notiosorex crawfordi
 Odocoileus
 Ondatra
 †Ondatra zibethicus
 †Onychocampodea – type locality for genus
 †Onychomachilis – type locality for genus
 Onychomys
 Ovis
 †Ovis canadensis – type locality for species
 Panthera
  †Panthera leo
 †Paramachaerodus
 †Paramylodon
 †Paramylodon harlani
 †Paronychomys
 Perognathus
 Peromyscus
 Pituophis
 †Pituophis melanoleucus
  †Platygonus
 †Platygonus compressus
 †Pleiolama
 †Plesiogulo
 †Plionarctos
 †Protolabis
 †Pseudaelurus – report made of unidentified related form or using admittedly obsolete nomenclature
 Ptinus
 †Rana
 Reithrodontomys
 †Repomys
  †Rhynchotherium
 Scaphiopus
 Sciurus
 †Sciurus aberti – or unidentified comparable form
 Sigmodon
 Sorex
 Spermophilus
 †Spermophilus variegatus
 Spilogale
 †Spilogale putorius
  †Stegomastodon
 †Stegomastodon mirificus
 †Stenomylus
 †Stockoceros
 Sylvilagus
 †Sylvilagus audubonii – or unidentified comparable form
 Tapirus
 †Tapirus merriami – or unidentified comparable form
 Taxidea
 †Taxidea taxus
 Tayassu
 †Tayassu tajacu
 †Teleoceras
 Terrapene
 †Terrapene ornata – or unidentified comparable form
  †Tetrameryx – or unidentified comparable form
 Thamnophis
 Thomomys
 †Titanotylopus
 †Trigonictis macrodon
 Urocyon
 Vulpes
 †Vulpes velox

References
 

Arizona
Arizona-related lists